Bupleurum semicompositum, the dwarf hare's ear, is a species of annual herb in the family Apiaceae. They have a self-supporting growth form and simple, broad leaves and dry fruit. Individuals can grow to 0.3m tall.

Sources

References 

semicompositum
Flora of Malta